Dealing with Dragons is a young adult fantasy novel written by Patricia C. Wrede, and is the first book in the Enchanted Forest Chronicles series. The novel chronicles the adventures of the princess Cimorene, who escapes her tediously ordinary family to become a dragon's princess. It received the 1991 Minnesota Book Award for Fantasy and Science Fiction.

Plot summary   
Princess Cimorene is frustrated by her life and persuades the castle staff to teach her fencing, magic, cooking, Latin, and other interesting subjects that are considered very "improper" for princesses to learn.

The King and Queen take Cimorene on a state visit to a neighboring kingdom. Cimorene learns that they plan to arrange her marriage to an annoying prince named Therandil. Faced with the prospect, Cimorene runs away. She meets a group of dragons and volunteers to become the "captive" princess of the dragon Kazul. Kazul assigns Cimorene to cook for her and organize her library and treasure hoard.

Cimorene likes her position and becomes friends with Kazul, but finds she must constantly deal with knights and princes who want to rescue her. She hopes that a sign on the road to the cave will keep would-be rescuers at bay.

While posting the sign, Cimorene encounters a wizard. After being annoyed, the wizard leaves using complicated magic, and Cimorene guesses that he is a powerful wizard. Later, Kazul explains that the dragons and the wizards disagree about the wizards' access to the Caves of Fire and Night. The wizards' staves absorb magic from any magical sources nearby – including dragons.

Cimorene and Alianora, princess to the dragon Woraug, find another wizard gathering herbs near the dragon caves. Cimorene brings a sample of the herb back to Kazul. Panicking, the dragon burns it up immediately, but the inhalation of the smoke causes Kazul to fall ill. The plant is dragonsbane, poisonous to dragons. Kazul sends Cimorene to warn another dragon that the wizards are gathering dragonsbane. This news comes too late as the King of the Dragons has already been fatally poisoned.

Although Kazul is still ill, she must leave to compete in the trials to choose the next King of the Dragons. (The King is a King regardless of gender.) Cimorene hurries through the dragon caves on errands for Kazul, where she meets a prince turned into a living statue.

Based on information from the Stone Prince and Alianora, Cimorene realizes that the wizards poisoned the King with the help of Woraug. The wizards plan to interfere with the trials to allow Woraug to win the title of King. In exchange, Woraug will give them access to the Caves and magical items held by the dragons.

Alianora discovers a way to melt wizards: soapy water mixed with lemon juice. With this discovery, and the help of her friends, Cimorene foils the wizards' plan. Meanwhile, Kazul wins the trials fairly and becomes the King of the Dragons.

Reception 
Reception to the novel has been positive. Kirkus Reviews called it "Smoothly written and ingenious fantasy", praising its non-stereotypical female protagonists. In 1991, Dealing With Dragons appeared on the ALA Best Book for Young Adults list (now ALA Best Fiction for Young Adults), the School Library Journal Best Book of the Year list, and the New York Public Library Best Book for the Teen Aged list.

Dealing With Dragons won the 1991 Minnesota Book Award for Fantasy and Science Fiction.

References

Citation
Wrede, Patricia C. Dealing with Dragons, Jane Yolen Books, 1990,  (1st edition). Published in the UK as Dragonsbane.

1990 American novels
1990 fantasy novels
American young adult novels
American fantasy novels
Enchanted Forest Chronicles
Young adult fantasy novels